

Bernhard Siebken (4 April 1910 – 20 January 1949) was a German SS commander during World War II and a convicted war criminal. He was sentenced to death for the killing of Canadian prisoners of war and was executed in 1949.
 
Siebken was one of the original members of the Leibstandarte SS Adolf Hitler (LSSAH). He took part in the invasion of Poland in 1939 and went on to serve on the Eastern Front. In 1944, Seibken commanded the 2nd Battalion, 26th SS Panzer Grenadier Regiment and later the 25th SS Panzer Grenadier Regiment; both with the SS Division Hitlerjugend. Siebken was awarded the Knight's Cross of the Iron Cross on 17 April 1945.

After the end of the war, he stood trial for war crimes related to his activities while in command of the 2nd Battalion, 26th Panzer Grenadier Regiment of the LSSAH. He was found guilty in the shootings of Canadian prisoners of war from the Queen's Own Rifles during the Battle of Le Mesnil-Patry and hanged on 20 January 1949.

Following the reburial of executed war criminals in Hamelin in 1954, the cemetery became the focal point for veterans' reunions, with distinct Nazi overtones. In 1959, for example, the convention of the lobby group and revisionist organisation of former Waffen-SS members, HIAG, concluded with "comrades gathering around [Siebken's] tomb" and laying a wreath.

Awards
Knight's Cross of the Iron Cross on 17 April 1945 as SS-Obersturmbannführer and commander of the SS-Panzergrenadier-Regiment 2 "Leibstandarte SS Adolf Hitler"

References

Bibliography

 
 
 

1910 births
1949 deaths
People from Pinneberg
People from the Province of Schleswig-Holstein
SS-Obersturmbannführer
Curiohaus trials executions by hanging
Recipients of the Knight's Cross of the Iron Cross
Executed people from Schleswig-Holstein
Waffen-SS personnel
Executed German people
Military personnel from Schleswig-Holstein